Eberhard Haun (1 October 1949 – 8 August 1976) was a German footballer. Haun, who spent three seasons in the Bundesliga with Eintracht Braunschweig, had to retire early from football in 1974 because of a knee injury and became an art student. He died just two years after his retirement in a car accident.

References

External links

1949 births
1976 deaths
German footballers
Germany under-21 international footballers
Germany B international footballers
SV Arminia Hannover players
Eintracht Braunschweig players
Association football midfielders
Bundesliga players
Road incident deaths in Germany